The 50s decade ran from January 1, 50, to December 31, 59. It was the sixth decade in the Anno Domini/Common Era, if the nine-year period from 1 AD to 9 AD is considered as a "decade".

The early years of the decade saw Roman and Parthian intervention in the Iberian–Armenian War, a conflict which led Tiridates I to become King of Armenia with Parthian support. This was unacceptable to Rome, and the ensuing tensions culminated in the Roman–Parthian War of 58–63. Concurrently, the Roman conquest of Britain continued, with Caratacus being defeated in 50 and tribes of modern Wales being subdued in 58 to 59. In 50, the Southern Xiongnu submitted to the Chinese Han dynasty. Later in 57, the ascension of Emperor Ming heralded the beginning of a golden age.

The Council of Jerusalem was held early in the decade: The council decided that Gentile converts to Christianity were not obligated to keep most of the fasts, and other specific rituals, including the rules concerning circumcision of males. The Council did, however, retain the prohibitions on eating blood, meat containing blood, and meat of animals that were strangled, and on fornication and idolatry.

Literary works of this decade include De Vita Beata (which explains that the pursuit of happiness is the pursuit of reason) and De Clementia (an instructional contrast between the good ruler and a tyrant), both of which were written by Seneca the Younger.

Manning (2008) tentatively estimates the world population in AD 50 as 248 million.

Demographics 

Due to lack of reliable demographic data, estimates of the world population in the 1st century vary wildly, with estimates for AD 1 varying from 150 to 300 million. Demographers typically do not attempt to estimate most specific years in antiquity, instead giving approximate numbers for round years such as AD 1 or AD 200. However, attempts at reconstructing the world population in more specific years have been made, with Manning (2008) tentatively estimating the world population in AD 50 as 248 million.

Significant people 
 Claudius, Roman Emperor (AD 41–54)
 Nero, Roman Emperor (AD 54–68)
 Kujula Kadphises, Kushan emperor
 Paul of Tarsus, Christian evangelist
 Emperor Ming of Han China

References